Aleksey Lebedev (born 1982) is a Russian luger who has competed since 2000. A natural track luger, he won the silver medal in the mixed team event at the 2005 FIL World Luge Natural Track Championships in Latsch, Italy.

References
FIL-Luge profile (as Aleksej Lebedev)
Natural track World Championships results: 1979-2007

1982 births
Living people
Russian male lugers